Bruno Godeau (born 10 May 1992) is a Belgian professional footballer who plays as a centre back for K.A.A. Gent in the Belgian First Division A.

Club career
Godeau started football career, where he was a youth club at RSD Jette, Anderlecht and MTK Budapest before returning to Anderlecht. Towards the end of the 2011–12 season, Godeau attracted interests from Lokeren and Heerenveen.

On the last day of the summer transfer window of 2012, Godeau joined Belgian Pro League rival Zulte-Waregem on loan for the remainder of the 2012–13 season. He made his debut for the club, in a 3–0 loss against Lokeren on 20 October 2012. Though receiving a little first team opportunities, Godeau playing time would increase as the season progress, under the management of Francky Dury. In the last game of the season, Godeau provided an assist for Jens Naessens to score the opener, in a 3–2 win over Mechelen on 16 March 2013. He then scored his first goal for the club with a header, though they would lose 4–3 to Standard Liège on 12 April 2013. Unfortunately, on 1 May 2014, Godeau scored an own goal, in a 4–0 loss against Genk, putting high doubt of winning the league for the first time in the club's history.

At the end of the 2012–13 season, with the good season finishing second place, Godeau would make twenty appearances and score once. On 20 April 2013, Godeau joined Zulte-Waregem on a four-year contract after the club exercise the right to sign Godeau. He made his Champions League debut in the third qualifying round second leg, as Zulte Waregem would lose 3–0 against PSV Eindhoven. He miss frequent of games, due to being on bench. Godeau had history of injuries during the season when he suffered mononucleosis, which kept him out for three weeks.

After his first full season at Zulte Waregem, on 16 July 2014, Godeau joined Westerlo on a two-year contract, joining on an undisclosed fee. Upon joining Westerlo, Godeau was number five shirt. In late October, Goadeau made his return from injuries. Godeau have since made sporadic appearance, as he only made nine appearances in the 2013–14 season.

International career
Having represented Belgium U18 levels in 2010, Godeau was called up by the Belgium U21 squad by the head coach Johan Walem. He made his U21 debut coming on as a substitute for Dennis Praet in the 33rd minute of a 3–1 loss against Norway.

References

External links

1992 births
Living people
Footballers from Brussels
Association football central defenders
Belgian footballers
R.S.C. Anderlecht players
S.V. Zulte Waregem players
K.V. Oostende players
Royal Excel Mouscron players
K.A.A. Gent players
Belgian Pro League players
Belgium under-21 international footballers
Belgium youth international footballers